Anita Gillette ( Luebben; born August 16, 1936) is an American actress. She had numerous roles on Broadway, American television, and in feature films. She also made many appearances as a celebrity guest on television game shows.

Early life
Gillette was born Anita Luebben in Baltimore, Maryland, the daughter of Juanita (née Wayland) and John Alfred Luebben. Raised in suburban Rossville, she graduated from Kenwood High School.

Career

Theatre 
Gillette studied at the Peabody Conservatory and made her Broadway debut in Gypsy in 1959. Additional Broadway credits include Carnival!, All American, Mr. President, Kelly, Jimmy, Guys and Dolls, Don't Drink the Water, Cabaret, They're Playing Our Song, Brighton Beach Memoirs, and Chapter Two, for which she was nominated for the Tony Award for Best Actress in a Play. She received a 1960 Theatre World Award for her performance in Russell Patterson's Sketchbook.

Television and film
Gillette's first television appearance was on The Ed Sullivan Show in 1963. She joined the cast of The Edge of Night in 1967, leaving the next year. Gillette's biggest exposure on a national scale came as a celebrity guest on various New York City-based game shows, mostly those produced by Goodson-Todman and Bob Stewart. She served as a semi-regular on the syndicated What's My Line?, Match Game and the various Pyramid series, among others. She also appeared with Robert Alda as a contestant on Fast Draw.

Gillette's roles in the 1970s included the short-lived series Me and the Chimp with Ted Bessell and Bob & Carol & Ted & Alice with a then-unknown Robert Urich and a young Jodie Foster. She also appeared in Norman Lear's All That Glitters (1977), and TV movies such as A Matter of Wife... and Death (1975) and It Happened at Lakewood Manor (1977).

The 1980s marked Gillette's transition from Broadway and television into a character film actress. Prior to this transition, she had sizeable television roles as Nancy Baxter on the national run of The Baxters, Quincy's second wife Dr. W. Emily Hanover on the last season of Quincy M.E. (having previously portrayed his deceased first wife Helen Quincy in a flashback), and a role on Search for Tomorrow at the end of that series' long run, as well as the early David Chase series Almost Grown (1988–1989).

After the end of Search for Tomorrow in late 1986, and appearing with Robert Reed and Bert Convy on Super Password, Gillette transitioned to film with a variety of notable roles such as that of Mona in 1987's Moonstruck. Many of these roles had her as an on-screen mother to characters played by prominent actors; she played Jack Black's mother in Bob Roberts (1992), Mary-Louise Parker's mother in Boys on the Side (1995), Bill Murray's mother in Larger Than Life (1996), Jennifer Aniston's mother in She's The One (1996), and the mother of Bobby Cannavale's love interest in The Guru (2002). Her return to television in 2000's short-lived Normal, Ohio had her playing the mother of John Goodman's character (coincidentally with fellow former game show regular Orson Bean as her on-screen husband).

In the 1990s, Gillette starred in two Hallmark Hall of Fame movies, The Summer of Ben Tyler (1996) with James Woods and A Christmas Memory (1997) with Patty Duke. In 2004, Gillette appeared as Miss Mitzi, the lonely alcoholic owner of a struggling dance studio in Shall We Dance?, opposite Richard Gere, Jennifer Lopez and Susan Sarandon. She made several appearances as Grandma Betty on Fox's The War at Home (2005–2007); as Lily Flynn, the mother of criminalist Catherine Willows, in four episodes of CSI (2005–2007/2012); and the mother of Liz Lemon in two episodes of 30 Rock (2007/2010). She starred in the 2006 film Hiding Victoria.

Since 2010 she has had several guest-starring roles in such shows as: Law & Order: Special Victims Unit (2010), Shake it Up (2012), Modern Family (2013), Blue Bloods (2013), Elementary (2015), Public Morals (2015) and Chicago Med (2016). She played Rose Fitzgerald in the 2012 film The Fitzgerald Family Christmas, written, directed by, and starring Edward Burns.

On February 17, 2020, Gillette was bestowed Honorary Member of The Lambs, America's oldest professional theatrical association.

Filmography

Film

Television

References

External links
 
 
 

1936 births
20th-century American actresses
21st-century American actresses
American film actresses
American soap opera actresses
American television actresses
American musical theatre actresses
Living people
Actresses from Baltimore